Sidi Boumediene Mosque or the Worshipper's Mosque is a historic Islamic religious complex In Tlemcen, Algeria, dedicated to the influential Sufi saint Abu Madyan. Abu Madyan was hailed from Seville and contributed greatly to the spread of tasawwuf in the Maghreb region.

History
The mosque was founded by the Marinid rulers of Morocco in 1339. The madrasa was founded eight years after the mosque, where Ibn Khaldun had taught once. Dar al-Sultan palace was established as well in the lower point of the complex, where the sultans stayed during their visit to the mosque. The Sidi al-Haloui Mosque, built in 1353, was closely modelled on it.

Architecture
The complex contains several religious buildings including the mosque, mausoleum, madrasa and the hamam. The mosque has the main entrance resembling that of the several other Moorish architectures from Córdoba to Kairouan. The entrance leads to the gallery of plaster paintings. On top of the dome exists muqarnas. It continues to the stairs which resemble that of the Puerta del Sol, Toledo. The wooden doors are decorated with bronze, and they lead to the sahn with the fountain in the middle and surrounded by corridors and prayer hall.

Gallery

See also
  Lists of mosques 
  List of mosques in Africa
  List of mosques in Algeria

References

Bibliography

Georges Marçais, L’architecture musulmane d’occident, Tunisie, Algérie, Espagne et Sicile, Paris, Arts et Métiers Graphiques, 1954, p.276
Georges Marçais, Les villes d'art célèbres. Tlemcen, éd. du Tell, Blida, 2003, rééd. de l'ouvrage paru en 1950 à la Librairie Renouard (Paris)

14th-century mosques
Mosques in Tlemcen
Marinid architecture